The carmine shiner (Notropis percobromus) is a freshwater fish species. In Manitoba, it was once known as the rosyface shiner (Notropis rubellus). It is now recognized as a different species within the rosyface shiner species complex, largely based on zoogeographic information. The carmine shiner is a member of the Minnow family, Cyprinidae. It has the following characteristics and distinguishing features:

 A slender, elongate minnow, typically 55 to 60 mm in length (Whitemouth River)
 Snout length is equal to the eye diameter
 Adults are olive green dorsally, silvery on the sides and silvery white on the belly
 Black pigment outlines the scale pockets dorsally; the opercula and cheeks may be pinkish
 Breeding males develop fine, sandpaper-like nuptial tubercles on the head, pectoral fins and some predorsal scales. They also turn pinkish violet around the head with a reddish tinge at the base of the dorsal fin. Breeding females are usually lighter in colour
 Seldom survives capture or handling and scales are easily dislodged

Distribution 
Eastern North America, in the United States it is found throughout the eastern part of the country from North and South Dakota in the west as far south as Arkansas. In Canada, this species has been found only in the Winnipeg River system, including the Whitemouth watershed. It may occur upstream to Lake of the Woods, Ontario. The Manitoba populations are at the northwestern limit of the distribution, separated from the continuous range of the species by 450 km.

Habitat and life history 
Carmine shiners typically summer at midwater depths of clear, fast flowing streams and small rivers over clean gravel or rubble substrates. They often school in riffles and pools near the confluence with larger streams and rivers. Habitat use during other seasons and by young-of-the-year has not been studied in Manitoba, nor has spawning. However, a ripe and running female was taken in the Pinawa Channel in 19.3 °C water. Southern populations typically spawn in riffles in May/June at temperatures of 20° to 28.9 °C. Adhesive eggs are deposited into depressions in gravel, often in the nests of other minnow species. Eggs hatch within 60 hours at 21 °C and newly hatched larvae work their way vertically into the gravel. These fish are mature at one year and live about three years. Individuals likely move into deeper water to winter.

A Species At Risk 

This species has been identified as Threatened by the Committee on the Status of Endangered Wildlife in Canada (COSEWIC). It is listed under the federal Species at Risk Act (SARA) and was afforded protection under the SARA as of June 2004. Additional protection is afforded through the federal Fisheries Act. Under the SARA, a recovery strategy must be developed for this species.

Diet 
This fish eats primarily aquatic insects, some terrestrial insects, fish eggs, algae and diatoms. Prey are located by sight.

Threats 
This species may be threatened by activities that alter turbidity, flow and/or substrate such as channelization, impoundment, drainage that increases sediment loading, streambed gravel removal and shoreline development. It has a narrow range of habitat requirements and may respond quickly to changes in habitat and water quality. During the past century, impoundments that have increased turbidity and decreased riffle habitat may have caused a decline in the abundance of this fish in the Winnipeg River system. Species introductions and bait harvesting may also pose a threat.

Similar species 
The carmine shiner resembles its close relative the emerald shiner (Notropis atherinoides), which has a deeper, more compressed body shape and blunter snout.

Text sources 
DFO/2005-858: Department of Fisheries and Oceans, Her Majesty the Queen in Right of Canada, 2005
Cat. No. Fs22-4/38-2005E-PDF 
Evermann and Goldsborough 1907; Houston 1994 (COSEWIC Status Report); Woods et al. 2002; Stewart and Watkinson 2004.

For more information, visit the SARA Registry Website at www.SARAregistry.gc.ca.

References 

 

Endangered fish
Notropis
Freshwater fish of North America
Fish described in 1871